Ecclesiastical History may refer to:

Church History (Eusebius)
Ecclesiastical History (Zacharias Rhetor)
Ecclesiastical History of the English People by Bede
Ecclesiastical History, by Evagrius Scholasticus

See also
Church history
History of Christianity
Historia Ecclesiastica (disambiguation)